"Illusive Existence" is the first song written by the British metalcore band Rise To Remain. Originally at the time of the release, their name was Halide. This debut song was released via their Myspace page.  After the release, the band began to establish a small following. At first, the song didn't seem to be getting much attention. However, over time, through word-of-mouth and, shameless self-promotion, led to them getting gigs with much more established metal bands such as Eternal Lord, Viatrophy, Exit Ten and Sylosis. After their show with Sylosis, they were offered to play at Download festival. As a result of this, the band changed their bassist and drummer, and also changed their name from Halide to what we now know them as: Rise To Remain.

The song was re-released in 2010 on the Bridges Will Burn (EP)

Personnel 
Rise To Remain
 Austin Dickinson – lead vocals
 Timothy Shelley – drums
 Ben Tovey – lead guitar
 Will Homer – rhythm guitar
 Theo Tan  – bass guitar

References

External links
 Myspace.com

2007 singles
Rise to Remain songs
2007 songs